Ádám Holczer (born 28 March 1988) is a Hungarian football player who plays for Tiszakécske.

Club statistics

Updated to games played as of 15 May 2021.

References

References 
HLSZ

1988 births
Living people
People from Ajka
Hungarian footballers
Association football goalkeepers
Vecsés FC footballers
Ferencvárosi TC footballers
Kecskeméti TE players
Nyíregyháza Spartacus FC players
Pécsi MFC players
Gyirmót FC Győr players
Kozármisleny SE footballers
Soroksári TE footballers
Paksi FC players
Tiszakécske FC footballers
Nemzeti Bajnokság I players
Nemzeti Bajnokság II players
Sportspeople from Veszprém County
21st-century Hungarian people